KCOF-LP (102.5 FM) was a radio station licensed to Captain Cook, Hawaii, United States.  The station was owned by Kona Info Inc.

KCOF-LP's license was cancelled by the Federal Communications Commission on February 1, 2014, due to the station's failure to file a license renewal application.

References

External links
 

COF-LP
COF-LP
Defunct radio stations in the United States
Radio stations disestablished in 2014
2014 disestablishments in Hawaii
COF-LP